The Basketball Bundesliga 2014–15 was the 49th season of the Basketball Bundesliga. The regular season started on 2 October 2014 and ended on 3 May 2015. The Playoffs started on 9 May and ended on 21 June 2015.

Brose Baskets was the top seed in the regular season. The team also won the title, after it beat Bayern Munich 3–2 in the Finals. TBB Trier and Crailsheim Merlins finished in the relegation places, but due to Artland Dragons withdrawing from the Bundesliga, Crailsheim accepted an offer to remain in the Bundesliga for 2015–16.

Team information

Standings

Results

Playoffs

Bracket

Statistical leaders

|  style="width:50%; vertical-align:top;"|

Rebounds

|}
|}

Assists

|}

Awards

All-Star Game

Broadcasting
On 17 June 2014 it was announced that, starting from this season, all BBL-games will be broadcast, as the league has signed a contract until 2018 with Telekom.

See also
2015 BBL-Pokal

Notes

References

External links
German League official website  

Basketball Bundesliga seasons
German
1